Nicholas Beaman (11 June 1897 – 1970) was a British water polo player. He competed in the men's tournament at the 1928 Summer Olympics.

References

1897 births
1970 deaths
British male water polo players
Olympic water polo players of Great Britain
Water polo players at the 1928 Summer Olympics
People from Medway